Enathu  is a village in Adoor Thaluk of  Pathanamthitta district in the state of Kerala, India.

Location
It is located 8 km away from the central Adoor Municipality. In the center lies Adoor to the east lies Kottarakkara.

Etymology

It has Kollam district as one of its borders. Enathu is famous with the old British-made bridge (demolished) across the Kallada River,

which links up the two districts (Pathanamthitta district and  Kollam district) with M.C (Main Central) passing through. Enathu Mahadevar Temple (Lord Shiva) is situated in the Enathu junction. It is a very old temple.kalamala "Chandanakkudam" is the main festival of the town on 6 December. The place Mannadi which is famous with Velu Thampi Dalawa  is the nearest historical place to Enathu.

There is a police station, post-office, bank, and a few famous hospitals in the area. Petrol pumps, software companies and many other modern facilities are also available here.

History
The famous Britishers Madeline and other engineers had visited enathu and built bridges and other facilities for the people living there. Enathu was never directly under the British Rule.

Demographics
According to the 2014 Kerala Census, Enathu had a population of 20,540 people.

See also
Enathu Bailey bridge

References

External links
 Adoor Municipality

Villages in Pathanamthitta district